Meri Mishaal is a Pakistani romantic drama television series premiered on Aaj Entertainment on 20 June 2020. It has Shazeal Shoukat, Hamza Tariq Jamil and Arman Ali Pasha in leads.

Plot 
It is the story of a young woman, Mishaal, who falls in love with famous actor Mahir Khan. Her love and dream of marrying Mahir motivates her to pursue a job in media, all the while knowing it's a dream that can never come true because she belongs to a middle-class family, and unwillingly marries Adeen.

Cast 
Shazeal Shoukat as Mishaal
Hamza Tariq Jamil as Adeen
Arman Ali Pasha as Mahir Khan
Aliya Habib as Ghazala; Mishaal's mother
Shazia Qaiser as Tarannum Aapa
Abeer Qureshi as Hooriya

References 

2020 Pakistani television series debuts
Pakistani television series
Urdu-language television shows